The name Ineng has been used for five tropical cyclones in the Philippines by PAGASA in the Western Pacific.

 Tropical Depression Ineng (2003) – a short-lived tropical cyclone.
 Typhoon Krosa (2007) (Ineng) – struck Taiwan and China.
 Typhoon Ma-on (Ineng) (2011) – struck Japan.
 Typhoon Goni (2015) (Ineng) – devastated northern Philippines.
Tropical Storm Bailu (2019) (Ineng) – made landfall on Taiwan and then in Fujian, China.

Pacific typhoon set index articles